Ronald Joseph Wetzel (born November 10, 1960) is a former American football tight end who played one season in the National Football League (NFL) for Kansas City Chiefs and one in the United States Football League (USFL) for the Arizona Outlaws. He played college football at Arizona State University and was a 4th round pick in the 1983 NFL Draft.

References 

1960 births
Living people
American football tight ends
Arizona State Sun Devils football players
Kansas City Chiefs players